Kyle Lindsay Allman Jr. (born September 2, 1997) is an American professional basketball player for Paris Basketball of the LNB Pro A. He played college basketball for the Cal State Fullerton Titans.

Early life and high school career
Allman was born and grew up in Brooklyn, New York. He attended St. John's Preparatory School for three years before transferring to the High School for Construction Trades, Engineering and Architecture before his senior year. He averaged 20 points and seven rebounds per game as a senior.

College career
Allman played four seasons for the Cal State Fullerton Titans. He was a key reserve for the team as a true freshman, averaging 5.1 points per game. He became a starter for the Titans as a sophomore and averaged 10.2 points, 2.3 rebounds and 2.1 assists per game. Allman enjoyed a breakout season in his junior year, recording a career-high 19.5 points while also averaging 3.5 rebounds and 2.3 assists per game in 32 games played (30 starts) and was named first team All-Big West Conference. Allman was named the 2018 Big West Conference tournament Most Valuable Player after scoring 26 points, six rebounds, three assists and three steals against UC Irvine in the conference championship game. As a senior, Allman was named first team All-Big West for a second straight season after averaging 17.5 points, three rebounds, and two assists per game. He finished his college career with the most games played in school history with 127 and fifth in points scored with 1,680.

Professional career

Lavrio
Allman was added to the Toronto Raptors Summer League roster after going unselected in the 2019 NBA Draft, but only appeared in one game and was not offered a contract by the team. Allman signed with Lavrio of the Greek Basket League on July 26, 2019. He averaged 11.1 points, 2.3 rebounds and 2.2 assists per game in his rookie season.

VEF Rīga
On July 18, 2020, Allman signed with VEF Rīga of the Latvian–Estonian Basketball League.

Paris Basketball
On July 20, 2021, he has signed with Paris Basketball of the LNB Pro A.

Career statistics

College

|-
| style="text-align:left;"| 2015–16
| style="text-align:left;"| Cal State Fullerton
| 30 || 3 || 18.8 || .365 || .250 || .648 || 1.6 || 1.0 || .4 || .1 || 5.1
|-
| style="text-align:left;"| 2016–17
| style="text-align:left;"| Cal State Fullerton
| 32 || 26 || 28.5 || .415 || .271 || .727 || 2.3 || 2.1 || .7 || .3 || 10.2
|-
| style="text-align:left;"| 2017–18
| style="text-align:left;"| Cal State Fullerton
| 32 || 30 || 32.9 || .489 || .429 || .746 || 3.5 || 2.3 || 1.1 || .2 || 19.5
|-
| style="text-align:left;"| 2018–19
| style="text-align:left;"| Cal State Fullerton
| 33 || 31 || 35.2 || .414 || .349 || .750 || 3.0 || 2.0 || .7 || .4 || 17.5
|- class="sortbottom"
| style="text-align:center;" colspan="2"| Career
| 127 || 90 || 29.1 || .434 || .352 || .730 || 2.6 || 1.9 || .7 || .3 || 13.2

References

External links
Cal State Fullerton Titans bio

1997 births
Living people
American expatriate basketball people in Greece
American men's basketball players
Basketball players from New York City
Cal State Fullerton Titans men's basketball players
Lavrio B.C. players
Paris Basketball players
Shooting guards
Sportspeople from Brooklyn